Houndmouth is an American alternative blues and rock band from New Albany, Indiana, formed in 2011, consisting of Matt Myers (guitar, vocals), Caleb Hickman (keyboard, vocals), Zak Appleby (bass, vocals), and Shane Cody (drums, vocals). Starting in 2022, Sam Filiatreau filled in for Appleby on tour.

Background
Houndmouth formed in the summer of 2011. After playing locally in Louisville and Indiana, they performed at the SXSW music festival in March 2012 to promote their homemade self-titled EP. Geoff Travis, the head of Rough Trade was in the audience and offered a contract shortly after. In 2012, the band was named "Band Of The Week" by The Guardian.

From the Hills Below the City (2013)
In 2013 Houndmouth's debut album, From the Hills Below the City, was released by Rough Trade. This led to performances on Letterman, Conan, World Cafe, and several major festivals (ACL, Americana Music Festival, Bonnaroo, Lollapalooza, and Newport Folk Festival). Spin and Esquire.com named Houndmouth a "must-see" band at Lollapalooza, and Garden & Gun said, "You'd be hard pressed to find a more effortless, well-crafted mix of roots and rock this year than the debut album from this Louisville quartet."

Little Neon Limelight (2015)
The band's second LP, Little Neon Limelight, was released on March 17, 2015. It includes the single "Sedona". The band performed "Sedona" on the Late Show with David Letterman on March 31, 2015, and at the El Rey Theatre in Los Angeles was featured on Last Call with Carson Daly on November 18 and 27, 2015.

Golden Age (2018)
On August 3, 2018, Houndmouth released their third album, Golden Age. This was the first album they released after Katie Toupin had left the band to pursue her own endeavors.

Good for You (2021)
On November 5, 2021, Houndmouth released their fourth album, the pandemic written Good For You. Written and recorded at The Green House in New Albany, Indiana, an 18th century shotgun house owned by the family of drummer Shane Cody, it is accompanied by several videos shot at the house and released around the time of the album's release.

Discography

Albums

Studio albums

Live albums
 Houndmouth Live From SXSW 2015 (2015)

EPs
 Houndmouth EP (2012)
 California Voodoo (2018)
 California Voodoo, Pt. II (2019)

Singles

Notes

References

External links
 
 Houndmouth: The Best of What's Next :: Music :: Features :: Paste
 Houndmouth Comes Alive | Mother Jones
 Live Review: Houndmouth at Chicago's Schubas Tavern (11/23) | Consequence of Sound
 Local band Houndmouth getting attention nationwide - wave3.com-Louisville News, Weather & Sports
 Americana band Houndmouth embraces its hometown, New Albany | Music | Kentucky.com
 Meet SXSW Secret Superstars Houndmouth - Show Clip - Fuse News - Fuse

Musical groups from Indiana
American alternative country groups
Musical groups established in 2011
2011 establishments in Indiana
Rough Trade Records artists